Gurdev Singh may refer to:

 Gurdev Singh (field hockey) (born 1933), former Indian field hockey player
 Gurdev Singh (musician) (born 1948), Indian-born musician based in London
 Gurdev Singh (footballer), former Indian footballer